Ram-Avtar is a 1988 movie starring Sunny Deol,Anil Kapoor, Sridevi and Shakti Kapoor. It was directed by Sunil Hingorani, written by Khalid, and produced by Sunil Hingorani. It is a remake of the Vyjayanthimala, Raj Kapoor and Rajendra Kumar-starrer Sangam (1964).

Cast
 Sunny Deol as Ram
 Anil Kapoor as Avtar
 Sridevi as Sangeeta "Shano"
 Shakti Kapoor as Gundappa Swami
 Bharat Bhushan as Ram's Grandfather
 Subbiraj as Sangeeta's Father
 Yunus Parvez as Sangeeta's Accountant
 Dinesh Hingoo as Gangiya
 Master Vikas as Young Avtar
 Master Keval Shah as Young Ram
 Manik Irani as Markoni

Plot
Ram (Sunny Deol) and Avtar (Anil Kapoor) are both childhood best friends. The difference between the two friends is that Ram would willingly make a priceless sacrifice for his friend; the time when both are separated is when Ram goes abroad to further his studies. In the meanwhile, Avtar takes up employment in an organization run by Sangeeta (Sridevi). Avtar is romantically attracted to Sangeeta, but Ram and Sangeeta fall in love with each other. When Ram gets to know that Avtar is in love with Sangeeta, he decides to sacrifice his love for his friend's sake by getting Avtar married to Sangeeta. But one of their enemies Gundappaswami is willing to expose Ram and Sangeeta's relationship to Avtar.

While dying, he tells Avtar that his wife is a woman of questionable character. Avtar starts suspecting his wife, and his wife calls upon Ram for help. But in the end, Ram reveals that he was the one who Sangeeta loved. When Avtar drinks poison, Ram sacrifices his life by donating every drop of his blood to Avtar. Ram dies after uniting Sangeeta and Avtar.

Soundtrack
Lyricist: Anand Bakshi

External links

1980s Hindi-language films
1988 films
Films scored by Laxmikant–Pyarelal